The men's 60 kilograms (Extra lightweight) competition at the 1998 Asian Games in Bangkok was held on 7 December 1998 at the Thammasat Gymnasium 1.

Schedule
All times are Indochina Time (UTC+07:00)

Results
Legend
DEC — Won by decision
IPP — Won by ippon
KOK — Won by koka
WAZ — Won by waza-ari
WO — Won by walkover
YUK — Won by yuko

Main bracket

Final

Top half

Bottom half

Repechage

References 

Results
Top 8

M60
Judo at the Asian Games Men's Extra Lightweight